Nienhuis is a Dutch toponymic surname. It is a form of Nieuwenhuis ("new house") found most commonly in the provinces of Groningen and Drenthe.

Geographical distribution
In 2014, 57.6% of all known bearers of the surname were residents of the Netherlands (frequency 1:9,281), 33.4% of the United States (1:342,418) and 5.4% of Canada (1:213,942).

In the Netherlands, the frequency of the surname was higher than national average (1:9,281) in the following provinces:
Groningen (1:1,206)
Drenthe (1:2,015)
Friesland (1:6,666)
Flevoland (1:7,688)
Overijssel (1:8,224)
Utrecht (1:8,945)

People
 Arthur W. Nienhuis (born 1950s), American physician
 Bert Nienhuis (1873–1960), Dutch ceramist
 Doug Nienhuis (born 1982), American football offensive lineman
 Han-Wen Nienhuys (born 1975), Dutch programmer, co-creator of Lilypond
 Hendrik Nienhuis (1790–1862), Dutch legal scholar
 Henk Nienhuis (1941–2017), Dutch football midfielder and manager
 Kraig Nienhuis (born 1961), Canadian professional ice hockey player
 Leonard Nienhuis (born 1990), Dutch football goalkeeper
Nienhuijs / Nienhuys
 Jacob Nienhuys (1836–1927), Dutch tobacco plantation owner and founder of Deli Company
 Jan Willem Nienhuys (born 1942), Dutch mathematician, book translator, and skeptic

See also
Nieuwenhuis, Nijenhuis, different forms of the same surname

References

Dutch-language surnames
Dutch toponymic surnames